Florence High School is a public high school located in Florence, Mississippi, United States. It serves the city of Florence, the communities of Cleary, King, and Monterey, and the surrounding areas to the Pearl River. It is a 5A school in the Mississippi High School Activities Association. It frequently fluctuates between a 4 and 5 rating, making it a successful high school in the Rankin County School District..

Staff 
The principal of Florence High School is Tony Martin.

Extracurricular Activities
Athletics at Florence High School include Archery, Baseball, Basketball, Bowling, Cheerleading, Cross Country, Dance, Football, Golf, Powerlifting, Soccer, Softball (Fast-Pitch), Softball (Slow-Pitch), Tennis, Track & Field, Volleyball, and JROTC. The school has a Band, The Big Red Band, and offers a Student Council and Student Tech Team.

Notable alumni
Tate Reeves (Class of 1992), Governor of Mississippi and former state treasurer.

References

External links

 https://fhs.rcsd.ms/faculty-staff
 https://fhs.rcsd.ms/activities/big-red-band/band-staff

Public high schools in Mississippi
Schools in Rankin County, Mississippi